Brie is both a feminine given name and a surname (last name). Notable people with the name include:

Given name
 Brie Gertler, American philosopher
 Brie Howard-Darling (born 1949), American musician and actress
 Brie Rogers Lowery, British business executive and political activist
 Brie Rippner (born 1980), American retired tennis player
 Alison Brie Schermerhorn, known as Alison Brie (born 1982), American actress

Surname
 André Brie (born 1950), German politician
 Alison Brie (born 1982), American actress

Stage name
 Brie Bella, ring name of one of the Bella Twins, a professional wrestling tag team
 Brie Larson (born Brianne Sidonie Desaulniers, 1989), American actress and pop singer

See also 
 Bree (name)